Handsome is the debut album of the Ian Dury rock group Kilburn and the High-Roads, released in June 1975 by Dawn Records. 

The band had apparently originally wanted to call the album No Hand Signals, but the idea was rejected by Dawn. The photo on the back cover displayed a Chuck Berry style duckwalk, which is said to be the inspiration for the Madness group's 'nutty train' on the front cover of their album (and single) One Step Beyond....

Track listing

Original album

Pye-Dawn re-released the original LP in 1977 following the success of Ian Dury as a solo artist.

1999 edition
In 1999, as part of their 30th Anniversary series, Dawn re-issued the album onto CD in a very unconventional way; instead of adding bonus tracks to the end of the album or on a second disc, Dawn decided to reorganise the album's track order to accommodate the missing B-sides as well as adding four previously unreleased tracks. These included a cover version of Alma Cogan's "Twenty Tiny Fingers", one of only two cover versions Ian Dury has ever officially released, the other being "Girls (Watching)" on his 1980 album Lord Upminster.

Track 1, 2 from the single "Rough Kids"
Tracks 3, 5-14 from the original LP Handsome
Track 4 from the single "Crippled with Nerves"
Tracks 15-18 previously unreleased

2016 edition
In 2016, Cherry Red Records released an expanded edition of Handsome with a bonus disc containing a previously unreleased 1974 Capital Radio broadcast. The first disc includes both the single and album version of "Rough Kids".

Disc 1
As per 1999 edition, adding "Rough Kids" (album version) as track 12 (between "Thank You Mum" and "The Badger and the Rabbit")

Disc 2

Personnel
Kilburn and the High-Roads
Ian Dury - vocals
Keith Lucas - guitar
Charles Sinclair - electric bass
Rod Melvin - piano; vocals on "Broken Skin" and "Thank You Mum"
David Newton-Rohoman - drums
Davey Payne - saxophone, flute

Additional musicians
Russell Hardy - keyboards on 1974 Capital Radio broadcast
Louis Larose or George Butler - drums on 1974 Capital Radio broadcast
Technical
Hugh Murphy – producer, arrangements 
Chris Thomas – producer on "Rough Kids" (single version) and "Billy Bentley (Promenades Himself in London)" 
Larry Bartlett - engineer
Phil Chapman - engineer
Elizabeth Rathmell - front cover painting "The Kilburns Near Tower Bridge"
Gordon House – graphics 
Poundcake – photography

First mixes

In 1996, Repertoire Records released a 2-CD Ian Dury retrospective Ian Dury & The Blockheads: Reasons to Be Cheerful which included tracks from all of his solo albums and many of his solo singles but instead of including tracks from either Handsome or Wotabunch! they chose to include 10 tracks recorded in 1974 which they claim are the first mixes for some of the tracks from Handsome. However, the version of "Rough Kids" is almost identical to the version on Wotabunch! (minus the ad-libs), and furthermore their time of recording suggests it is possible the tracks are in fact from the Raft recordings, regardless the ten tracks are  "Rough Kids", "You're More Than Fair", "Billy Bentley", "Pam's Moods", "Upminster Kid", "The Roadette Song", "Pam's Moods 2", "The Call-Up" and the wrong titled "The Mumble Rumble" ("The Mumble Rumble and the Cocktail Rock"). "Pam's Moods 2" is another mix of "Pam's Moods".

These tracks show little signs of the smooth, softened, high-produced versions finally released on Handsome and are far similar to the band's live sound and are not mentioned at all in either Ian Dury autobiography and noticeably included "You're More Than Fair", which was not included on the final album.

References

Further reading
Sex and Drugs and Rock and Roll: The Life of Ian Dury by Richard Balls, first published 2000, Omnibus Press
Ian Dury & the Blockheads: Song by Song by Jim Drury, first published 2003, Sanctuary Publishing
Reasons to Be Cheerful, 2-disc compilation first released 1996, Repertoire Records
Booklet to the Dawn's 1998 re-issue of Handsome

External links

1975 debut albums
Kilburn and the High Roads albums
Albums produced by Chris Thomas (record producer)
Dawn Records albums